Chungnyeolsa Station is an underground station of the Busan Metro Line 4 in Allak-dong, Dongnae District, Busan, South Korea.

Station Layout

Vicinity
 Exit 1: Dongnae Police Station Chungryeol District
 Exit 2: Jinsong Sushi
 Exit 3: The Camp Busan Branch
 Exit 4:

External links

  Cyber station information from Busan Transportation Corporation

Busan Metro stations
Dongnae District
Railway stations opened in 2011